Flint Island is an uninhabited coral island in the central Pacific Ocean, part of the Southern Line Islands under the jurisdiction of Kiribati. In 2014 the Kiribati government established a  exclusion zone around each of the southern Line Islands (Caroline (commonly called Millennium), Flint, Vostok, Malden, and Starbuck).

Geography
The island is surrounded by a narrow fringing reef and with no safe anchorage, landing is difficult.

According to the U.S. Exploring Expedition (February 5, 1841), the island was thickly wooded with primeval forest, however the island is now mostly covered with planted coconut palms.

History
Flint island was discovered by the Spanish expedition of Ferdinand Magellan on 4 February 1521, and charted as Tiburones (Sharks in Spanish) because of the many sharks that sailors fished in it. Together with Puka-Puka (named San Pablo) they were named Islas Infortunadas (Unfortunate Islands in Spanish). A now-discredited theory held that the island was named after Captain Keen, who visited in 1835, but an entry in Krusenstern's Hydrographie der grössern Ozeane, published in 1819, makes it clear the island already had this name. Flint Island was claimed under the 1856 U.S. Guano Act, but it was apparently never occupied.

It was leased by the British to Houlder Brothers and Co. of London who carried out guano digging in the central part of the island from 1875 to 1880 under field manager John T. Arundel. From 1881 John T. Arundel & Co. carried on the mining business. The excavated areas have since filled with brackish water, forming two or three small lagoons. Coconut palms were planted on the island by Arundel in 1881 and copra was produced until 1891. The island was leased in 1911 to S.R. Maxwell and Co., Ltd. who employed 30 men and one manager to harvest copra from the approximately 30,000 coconut palms.

On January 3, 1908 a total eclipse of the sun was observed on the island by an expedition from the Lick Observatory in California. The observation point on the island was determined to be at   latitude.

Photo gallery

See also

 List of Guano Island claims
 List of islands
 Desert island

References

External links
 National Geographic - Southern Line Islands Expedition, 2014
Flint Island information
More Flint Island information
 Krusenstern, A. J. von: Beyträge zur Hydrographie der grössern Ozeane als Erläuterungen zu einer Charte des ganzen Erdkreises nach Mercators Projection; Leipzig : Kummer, 1819 (from the digital collections of the Göttingen Library) (p. 208)

Uninhabited islands of Kiribati
Pacific islands claimed under the Guano Islands Act
Former populated places in Kiribati
Former populated places in Oceania
Line Islands
Coral islands
Former disputed islands
Line Islands (Kiribati)